Single by Contract ( [Groupies don't stay for breakfast]) is a 2010 German comedy film directed by Marc Rothemund.

Plot
Lila (Anna Fischer) returns to Berlin after spending a year in the United States. She meets Chriz (Kostja Ullmann) and falls in love with him. Unbeknown to her, Chriz is the celebrated star of Berlin Mitte, a famous band.

Cast 
 Anna Fischer - Lila Lorenz
 Kostja Ullmann - Chriz
 Inka Friedrich - Dr. Angelika Lorenz
  - Luzy Lorenz
  - Nike
  - Paul
  - Tom

References

External links 

2010 comedy films
2010 films
German comedy films
Films directed by Marc Rothemund
2010s German films
2010s German-language films